Seleman Salum Kidunda (also spelled Selemani) (born 2 January 1984 in Ruvuma) is a Tanzanian boxer. He competed in the 2010 Commonwealth Games. Kidunda also competed in the Men's welterweight event at the 2012 Summer Olympics but lost to Moldovan Vasile Belous in the first round. The loss was blamed on several referee mistakes.  At the 2014 Commonwealth Games, where he was the Tanzanian flag-bearer, he lost in the first round to Kehinde Ademuyiwa.  He took up the sport of boxing after seeing Mike Tyson box on television and was named Tanzanian Boxer of the Year by the Tanzania Sports Writers Association.

References

Living people
People from Ruvuma Region
Welterweight boxers
Olympic boxers of Tanzania
Tanzanian male boxers
Commonwealth Games competitors for Tanzania
Boxers at the 2010 Commonwealth Games
Boxers at the 2012 Summer Olympics
1984 births
Boxers at the 2014 Commonwealth Games